J.N.N Matriculation & Higher Secondary School is a school located in Tiruvallur, Tamil Nadu, India. It is approved by the Directorate of Matriculation Schools, Tamil Nadu. The school was established in 2008 and is promoted by the Alamelu Ammaal Educational Trust.

The Trust also manages J.N.N Institute of Engineering, J.N.N Arts & Science Women's College, J.N.N Vidyallaya and J.N.N Educational College.

References

External links
 

High schools and secondary schools in Tamil Nadu
Education in Tiruvallur district